Hippocampal sclerosis (HS) or mesial temporal sclerosis (MTS) is a neuropathological condition with severe neuronal cell loss and gliosis in the hippocampus, specifically in the CA-1 (Cornu Ammonis area 1) and subiculum of the hippocampus. It was first described in 1880 by Wilhelm Sommer. Hippocampal sclerosis is a frequent pathologic finding in community-based dementia. Hippocampal sclerosis can be detected with autopsy or MRI. In MRI, a decrease in signal is observed at T1 and an increase in signal at T2. Positron emission tomography is also used as an aid for diagnosis. In PET examination, glucose uptake is lower than in the normal part. The reason for this is that the sclerotic part works at a lower level than the normal part and needs less energy. Individuals with hippocampal sclerosis have similar initial symptoms and rates of dementia progression to those with Alzheimer's disease (AD) and therefore are frequently misclassified as having Alzheimer's Disease. But clinical and pathologic findings suggest that hippocampal sclerosis has characteristics of a progressive disorder although the underlying cause remains elusive.
A diagnosis of hippocampal sclerosis has a significant effect on the life of patients because of the notable mortality, morbidity and social impact related to epilepsy, as well as side effects associated with antiepileptic treatments. Findings indicate that there is a strong genetic connection in the development of mesial temporal sclerosis. Mesial temporal sclerosis used to be most commonly found as a single lesion in the brains of chronic epileptics who died a natural death which was estimated to be developed as a result of continued febrile convulsions.

Symptoms and signs

Histopathological hallmarks of hippocampal sclerosis include segmental loss of pyramidal neurons, granule cell dispersion and reactive gliosis. This means that pyramidal neuronal cells are lost, granule cells are spread widely or driven off, and glial cells are changed in response to damage to the central nervous system (CNS).
Generally, hippocampal sclerosis may be seen in some cases of epilepsy, particularly temporal lobe epilepsy. It is important to clarify the nature of insults that most likely have caused the hippocampal sclerosis and have initiated the epileptogenic process. Presence of hippocampal sclerosis and duration of epilepsy longer than 10 years were found to cause parasympathetic autonomic dysfunction, whereas seizure refractoriness was found to cause sympathetic autonomic dysfunction. Apart from its association with the chronic nature of epilepsy, hippocampal sclerosis was shown to have an important role in internal cardiac autonomic dysfunction. Patients with left hippocampal sclerosis had more severe parasympathetic dysfunction as compared with those with right hippocampal sclerosis. In young individuals, mesial temporal sclerosis is commonly recognized with temporal lobe epilepsy (TLE). On the other hand, it is an often unrecognized cause of cognitive decline, typically presenting with severe memory loss.

Temporal lobe epilepsy 
Hippocampal sclerosis is often associated with temporal lobe epilepsy. Ammon's horn sclerosis (AHS) is the type of hippocampal sclerosis associated with mesial temporal lobe epilepsy. The terms are often used interchangeably but Ammon's horn sclerosis does not involve the dentate gyrus. 

The type of neuronal loss in temporal lobe epilepsy (TLE), is primarily found in the hippocampus, and can be seen in approximately 65% of TLE cases. Sclerotic hippocampus is pointed to as the most likely origin of chronic seizures in temporal lobe epilepsy, rather than the amygdala or other temporal lobe regions. Although hippocampal sclerosis has been identified as a distinctive feature of the pathology associated with temporal lobe epilepsy, this disorder is not merely a consequence of prolonged seizures as argued. A long and ongoing debate addresses the issue of whether hippocampal sclerosis is the cause or the consequence of chronic and pharmaceutically resistant seizure activity. Temporal lobectomy is a common treatment for TLE, surgically removing the seizure focal area, though complications can be severe.

Mesial temporal lobe epilepsy (MTLE), may be due to hippocampal sclerosis, or due to thalamic changes in temporal lobe epilepsy with and without hippocampal sclerosis,

Causes

Aging 
Although hippocampal sclerosis is relatively commonly found among elderly people (≈10% of individuals over the age of 85 years), association between this disease and aging remains unknown.

Vascular risk factors 
There were also observations that hippocampal sclerosis was associated with vascular risk factors. Hippocampal sclerosis cases were more likely than Alzheimer's disease to have had a history of stroke (56% vs. 25%) or hypertension (56% vs. 40%), evidence of small vessel disease (25% vs. 6%), but less likely to have had diabetes mellitus (0% vs. 22%).

Socioeconomic status 
Socioeconomic correlates of health have been well established in the study of heart disease, lung cancer, and diabetes. Many of the explanations for the increased incidence of these conditions in people with lower socioeconomic status (SES) suggest they are the result of poor diet, low levels of exercise, dangerous jobs (exposure to toxins etc.) and increased levels of smoking and alcohol intake in socially deprived populations. Hesdorffer et al. found that low SES, indexed by poor education and lack of home ownership, was a risk factor for epilepsy in adults, but not in children in a population study. Low socioeconomic status may have a cumulative effect for the risk of developing epilepsy over a lifetime.

Diagnosis

Classification
Mesial temporal sclerosis is a specific pattern of hippocampal neuron cell loss. There are three specific patterns of cell loss. Cell loss might involve sectors CA1 and CA4, CA4 alone, or CA1 to CA4. Associated hippocampal atrophy and gliosis is common. MRI scan commonly displays increased T2 signal and hippocampal atrophy. Mesial temporal sclerosis might occur with other temporal lobe abnormalities (dual pathology). Mesial temporal sclerosis is the most common pathological abnormality in temporal lobe epilepsy. It has been linked to abnormalities in TDP-43.

Treatment

It is refractory to treatment with anti-epileptics but surgically treatable with Hippocampectomy, sometimes amygdala is also removed.The procedure is known as Antero-medial temporal lobe resection.

References

External links 

Central nervous system disorders
Epilepsy
Disorders causing seizures
Hippocampus (brain)